The Dodgeville Municipal Airport was a municipal airfield near Dodgeville, Wisconsin. Originally name the Governor Dodge Quinn Airport, it operated from approximately 1967 until around 1989–1990. The property was later bought by a local construction firm. As of 2017, the runway, ramp, and hangar still exist, with the outdoor paved surfaces used for equipment storage. The only surviving airport in Iowa County is in Mineral Point, Wisconsin.

History
Built at some point between May and December 1967, it operated as a small, unpaved municipal airport called Governor Dodge Quinn Airport. The exact date is unknown as it doesn't appear on the Milwaukee Sectional Chart until December 1967. It was later renamed Dodgeville at some point within the next 3 years according to the May 1970 Milwaukee Sectional Chart.

The Dodgeville Airport closed (for reasons unknown) at some point between 1989 and 1990, as it wasn't depicted on the May 1990 or April 1994 Chicago Sectional Charts.

C-97 display

One of the landmarks in the area is currently on display at an inn next to the Dodgeville Municipal Airport.  In 1977, the former owners of the Don Q Inn bought an old Boeing C-97G. Its history was connected to two commercials for the Mercury Cougar in 1975 and actress Farrah Fawcett's signature was purported to be on fuselage until it was painted over in approximately 2010. The plane, whose tail number is N227AR (S/N 52-2764), was built in 1952 and it logged a total of 10,068 hours of flight before being landed at the airport to much publicity on the airport's comparatively tiny 2,800' runway in 1977. As it landed, the main landing gear was a full  outside the edge of the runway, creating a cloud of dust as the pilot, Dick Schmidt, threw on the brakes and killed the engines to stop the massive plane.

The original plans called for the plane to be converted into a restaurant outside the Inn, but when it appeared to be improbable, the owner decided to leave it intact and to stand as a museum of sorts. For a while the plane was being used for storage but was cleaned up before falling into a state of disrepair.

References

External links

Buildings and structures in Iowa County, Wisconsin
Airports in Wisconsin